TPS or Tps may refer to:

In arts and entertainment
Télévision Par Satellite, a French satellite television company
Third-person shooter, a game genre
Torsonic Polarity Syndrome, in South Park animation
Trailer Park Sex, a band from Hamburg-St.Pauli, Germany
Transmission Parameters Signalling, in DVB-T digital TV standard
Turner Program Services, TV syndication

In government and politics
Temporary protected status, a non-immigration designation in the United States
Toronto Police Service
Toronto Paramedic Services
Telangana Praja Samithi, an Indian political party
U.S. Air Force Test Pilot School, Edwards AFB, California

In mathematics, science, and technology

In computing
TPS report, Test Procedure Specification, in quality assurance
Transaction processing system
Transactions per second, usually in database management or digital currencies
Transition path sampling, in rare event sampling

In mathematics
Theorem Proving System, Carnegie Mellon University system
Twin Prime Search, computing project seeking large twin primes
Thin plate spline, interpolation technique

Other uses in science and technology
Thermal protection system for spacecraft re-entry
Thermoplastic-sheathed cable
Throttle position sensor, in an internal combustion engine
True potato seed, as distinct from a seed tuber
Transit signal priority for mass transit vehicles at traffic lights

In sports
The Players Series, a series of professional golf tournaments in Australia

Entities and former teams of the sports club Turun Palloseura, based in Turku, Finland:
HC TPS, an ice hockey team in the Finnish Liiga
TPS Naiset, a women’s ice hockey team in the Finnish Naisten Liiga
Turun Palloseura, Finnish association football club
Turun Palloseura (floorball), a floorball team in the Finnish Salibandyliiga

Other uses
Telephone Preference Service, a UK telemarketing opt-out telephone list
Tenants Purchase Scheme, a public housing scheme in Hong Kong
The Petersfield School, in southern England
Toyota Production System, organizes manufacturing and logistics
Trapani-Birgi Airport in Italy (IATA airport code)
Tourism Promotion Services, trading name of Serena Hotels Group
Turns per Second, speedcubing term

See also
TP (disambiguation)